Individual jumping equestrian at the 2010 Asian Games was held in Guangzhou Equestrian Venue, Guangzhou, China from November 22 to November 24, 2010.

Schedule
All times are China Standard Time (UTC+08:00)

Results
Legend
EL — Eliminated
RT — Retired
WD — Withdrawn

Qualifier

Final round A

Final round B

References
Results at FEI

External links
Official website 

Individual jumping